Locate S,1 is the stage name of American musician Christina Schneider.

History
Schneider began her career making music in various projects, such as C.E Schneider Topical.
, Christina Schneider's Genius Giant, and Jepeto Solutions. In 2018, Schneider began making music under the moniker Locate S,1. Schneider released her first full-length album under the moniker that year, titled Healing Contest. The album was produced by Kevin Barnes of Of Montreal. In 2020, Schneider released her second album as Locate S,1 titled Personalia, via Captured Tracks.

References

Living people
Captured Tracks artists
Year of birth missing (living people)